Hypoprora is a genus of moths of the family Erebidae. The genus was erected by George Hampson in 1926.

Species
Hypoprora lophosoma (Turner, 1906) Queensland
Hypoprora tortuosa Turner, 1929 Queensland
Hypoprora tyra (C. Swinhoe, 1902) Western Australia

References

Calpinae
Noctuoidea genera